Alexia Dechaume and Florencia Labat were the defending champions, but Dechaume did not compete this year.

Labat teamed up with Barbara Rittner and lost in the final to Rachel McQuillan and Claudia Porwik. The score was 4–6, 6–4, 6–2.

Seeds

Draw

Draw

References

External links
 Official results archive (ITF)
 Official results archive (WTA)

Women's Doubles
1993 WTA Tour